is a village located in Nagano Prefecture, Japan. , the village had an estimated population of 4,910 in 1628 households, and a population density of 64 persons per km². Nakagawa is listed as one of The Most Beautiful Villages in Japan.

Geography
Nakagawa is located in the Ina Valley of south-central Nagano Prefecture in the Kiso Mountains. The Tenryū River flows through the village. The Koshibu Dam is located in Nakagawa.

Surrounding municipalities
Nagano Prefecture
 Komagane
 Iijima
 Matsukawa
 Ōshika

Climate
The village has a climate characterized by characterized by hot and humid summers, and cold winters (Köppen climate classification Cfa).  The average annual temperature in Nakagawa is 9.7 °C. The average annual rainfall is 1691 mm with September as the wettest month. The temperatures are highest on average in August, at around 22.25 °C, and lowest in January, at around -2.4 °C.

Demographics
Per Japanese census data, the population of Nakagawa has been declining over the past 70 years.

History
The area of present-day Nakagawa was part of ancient Shinano Province. The villages of Katagiri and Minakata merged on August 1, 1959 to form the village of Nakagawa.

Education
The village has two public elementary schools and one public junior high school operated by the village government. The village does not have a high school.

Transportation

Railway
 Central Japan Railway Company - Iida Line

Highway

Notable people from Nakagawa
Kōichi Shiozawa, Admiral in the Imperial Japanese Navy

References

External links

Official Website 

 
Villages in Nagano Prefecture